Kilteevan is a village and parish in County Roscommon, Ireland. It is 6 km to the east of Roscommon town, and 9 km to the north of Knockcroghery village.

The village contains a Catholic church, former mass rock, community centre, primary school, public house, karting track and GAA park.
The polling station for the area during elections and referendums is located in the primary school.

The Hollywood actor Tom Cruise can trace his roots back to Kilteevan through his real surname, Maypother.

The parents of the former director of the CIA, John Brennan, emigrated from Kilteevan to New Jersey in 1948. He returned to Kilteevan with his brother and father in August 2013 as part of the Gathering celebrations.

Further reading 
 Hazel A. Ryan (1997) Kilteevan: A Look At A School And Its Parish

References 

Towns and villages in County Roscommon